Thestor is a genus of butterflies in the family Lycaenidae. The species are Afrotropical.

Species
Thestor barbatus Henning & Henning, 1997 – bearded skolly
Thestor basutus (Wallengren, 1857) – Basuto skolly, Basuto magpie
Thestor brachycerus (Trimen, 1883) – Knysna skolly
Thestor braunsi van Son, 1941 – Braun's skolly
Thestor calviniae Riley, 1954 – Hantamsberg skolly
Thestor camdeboo Dickson & Wykeham, 1994 – Camdeboo skolly
Thestor claassensi Heath & Pringle, 2004 – Claassen's skolly
Thestor compassbergae Quickelberge & McMaster, 1970 – Compassberg skolly
Thestor dicksoni Riley, 1954 – Dickson's skolly
Thestor dryburghi van Son, 1966 – Dryburgh's skolly
Thestor holmesi van Son, 1951 – Holmes's skolly
Thestor kaplani Dickson & Stephen, 1971 – Kaplan's skolly, Kaplan's thestor 
Thestor montanus van Son, 1941 – mountain skolly
Thestor murrayi Swanepoel, 1953 – Murray's skolly
Thestor overbergensis Heath &  Pringle, 2004 – Overberg skolly
Thestor penningtoni van Son, 1949 – Pennington's skolly
Thestor petra Pennington, 1962 – rock skolly
Thestor pictus van Son, 1941 – Langeberg skolly
Thestor pringlei Dickson, 1976 – Pringle's skolly
Thestor protumnus (Linnaeus, 1764) – Boland skolly
Thestor rileyi Pennington, 1956 – Riley's skolly
Thestor rooibergensis Heath, 1994 – Rooiberg skolly
Thestor rossouwi Dickson, 1971 – Rossouw's skolly
Thestor stepheni Swanepoel, 1968 – Stephen's skolly
Thestor strutti van Son, 1951 – Strutt's skolly
Thestor vansoni Pennington, 1962 – Van Son's skolly
Thestor yildizae Koçak, 1983 – peninsula skolly

External links
Thestor at Markku Savela's website on Lepidoptera

 
Miletinae
Lycaenidae genera
Taxa named by Jacob Hübner
Taxonomy articles created by Polbot